Anton "Charley" van de Weerd (January 18, 1922, Wageningen – February 3, 2008, Wageningen) was a Dutch football player.

Van de Weerd played from 1940 to 1961 for FC Wageningen, interrupted only by a season at De Graafschap. He won the KNVB Cup with Wageningen in 1948. He played in more than 600 league games. He was once called up for the Netherlands national football team, but never made his debut. His nickname, Charley, was a tribute to his favorite actor, Charlie Chaplin. After his football career Van de Weerd owned a sports shop in Wageningen.

Van de Weerd died at the age of 86 years on February 3, 2008.

References 

1922 births
2008 deaths
Dutch footballers
People from Wageningen
De Graafschap players
FC Wageningen players

Association footballers not categorized by position
Footballers from Gelderland